Laura Veres (born 21 August 2005) is a Hungarian swimmer. She competed in the women's 4 × 200 metre freestyle relay at the 2020 Summer Olympics.

References

External links
 

2005 births
Living people
Hungarian female freestyle swimmers
Olympic swimmers of Hungary
Swimmers at the 2020 Summer Olympics
People from Gyula
Sportspeople from Békés County
21st-century Hungarian women